The Faculty of Medicine is one of four medical schools in Quebec. The faculty is part of the Université de Montréal and is located in Montreal and Trois-Rivières.

Recent accolades for the school include an endowment by Pfizer (worth $1.8 million) for a chair in atherosclerosis and being awarded a million-dollar grant for the study of leukemia.

The Faculty offers a variety of undergraduate programs, graduate programs, the Doctor of Medicine, and several postgraduate medical programs. It also offers the only francophone health management training program in North America.

In partnership with the Centre de pédagogie appliquée aux sciences de la santé (CPASS), the Faculty provides practicing physicians, trainers, students and researchers with colloquia, online tools and continuing professional development and health sciences education activities.

References

Montreal
Medicine